Platinum prints, also called platinotypes, are photographic prints made by a monochrome printing process involving platinum.

Platinum tones range from warm black, to reddish brown, to expanded mid-tone grays that are unobtainable in silver prints.

Unlike the silver print process, platinum lies on the paper surface, while silver lies in a gelatin or albumen emulsion that coats the paper. As a result, since no gelatin emulsion is used, the final platinum image is absolutely matte with a deposit of platinum (and/or palladium, its sister element which is also used in most platinum photographs) absorbed slightly into the paper.

Platinum prints are the most durable of all photographic processes. The platinum group metals are very stable against chemical reactions that might degrade the print—even more stable than gold. It is estimated that a platinum image, properly made, can last thousands of years. Some of the desirable characteristics of a platinum print include:
 The reflective quality of the print is much more diffuse in nature compared to glossy prints that typically have specular reflections.
 A very delicate, large tonal range.
 Not being coated with gelatin, the prints do not exhibit the tendency to curl.
 The darkest possible tones in the prints are lighter than silver-based prints. Recent studies have attributed this to an optical illusion produced by the gelatin coating on Resin Coated and fiber-based papers. However, platinotypes that have been waxed or varnished will produce images that appear to have greater maximum density than silver prints.
 A decreased susceptibility to deterioration compared to silver-based prints due to the inherent stability of the process and also because they are commonly printed on 100% rag papers.
Many practitioners have abandoned platinum and only use palladium. The process using palladium alone (sodium tetrachloropalladate) is similar to standard processes, but rather than using ferric oxalate plus potassium chlorate as the restrainer (which is ineffective for palladium), a weak solution of sodium chloroplatinate is used instead.  Sodium chloroplatinate, in contrast to potassium chlorate, does not cause grain. This formula is generally referred to as the Na2 method. This somewhat misleading abbreviation was coined by Richard Sullivan of Bostick & Sullivan, one of the principal suppliers of chemistry and printing supplies, who popularized the process.

History 
The first person to have recorded observing the action of light rays on platinum was Ferdinand Gehlen of Germany in 1830. The following year, his countryman, Johann Wolfgang Dobereiner, determined that the action of light on platinum was quite weak, but that perhaps something could be combined with platinum to increase its sensitivity. Through experimentation, he eventually found that ferric oxalate was a highly-effective enhancer. The combination of these two metals remains the basis of the platinotype process in use today.

In 1832, Englishmen Sir John Herschel and Robert Hunt conducted their own experiments, further refining the chemistry of the process. In 1844, in his book Researches on Light, Hunt recorded the first known description of anyone employing platinum to make a photographic print. However, although he tried several different combinations of chemicals with platinum, none of them succeeded in producing any permanency in the image. All of his prints faded after several months.

Over the next decade, Hunt noted that platinum prints he had left in the dark faded very slowly but gradually resumed their original density, and had also shifted from a negative to a positive image, eventually becoming permanent.

By the early 1850s, however, other more reliable photographic processes, such as salt and albumen printing, had been developed and were beginning to be widely used. Those scientists who had previously conducted research on platinum lost interest in the process as other methods became more commercially viable. The only major advances in platinum research reported during that decade were made independently by C.J. Burnett and Lyonel Clark of Great Britain. In 1859, Burnett published an article in the British Journal of Photography describing his use of sodium chloroplatinate as a fixing agent. His modification of the platinum printing process resulted in prints that were permanent enough that he could exhibit them in public. That same year, Clark also exhibited prints made using a slightly different process.

Patents 
William Willis was the first to patent the platinotype process in 1873  (British Patent No. 2011, June 8, 1873), and again in 1878 and 1880, which he leveraged to gain commercial success in the manufacture of platinum papers sold through his Platinotype Company for professional and amateur use.  He also developed the palladium process requiring palladiotype paper and a silver-platinum paper, Satista.

Willis introduced the "hot bath" method where a mixture of ferric oxalate and potassium chloroplatinate are coated onto paper which is then exposed through a negative and developed in a warm solution of potassium oxalate.

Commercialization 
While Willis had greatly advanced the chemistry of the platinum process, there was still no reliable method for the individual preparation of platinum paper by 1880. Two years, later two Austrian Army officers, Giuseppe Pizzighelli and Arthur Baron V. Hubl, published a dissertation describing a straightforward process for preparing the paper. They continued their research for several years, and in 1887, Pizzighelli patented a new process that made the commercial production of platinum paper viable for the first time. The new process was briefly known as a "Pizzitype" and was marketed under the name "Dr. Jacoby's Printing Out Paper."

Willis quickly countered this advance by obtaining two more patents in 1888 for cold-bath processes. By adding more platinum to the developing process, he produced prints that had dense brown-black shadows rather than the lighter browns that were the best that previous processes could produce. While much more aesthetically pleasing, prints developed by this process were difficult to produce reliably.

Four years later, Willis began manufacturing a platinum paper that was designed for the cold-bath process, and this became the standard for the rest of the decade. The business he started in 1880, called the Platinotype Company, rapidly expanded, and soon he was selling his paper throughout Europe and in the United States. By 1906, his company had sales totaling US $273,715 ($ in 2009 dollars), a significant amount at that time.

Seeing the skyrocketing demand for platinum paper, the Eastman Kodak Company in Rochester, New York, tried to develop its own line of paper starting in 1901, but they could not duplicate the quality of Willis's product. Kodak then tried to buy Willis's company but was not able to come to an agreement. Kodak instead bought the relatively new company of Joseph Di Nunzio who had recently developed his own brand of platinum paper comparable to Willis's, which he sold under the name of "Angelo".  Kodak continued to sell this paper for several years before it was eventually discontinued.

When Willis began marketing his paper, platinum was relatively cheap. By 1907, platinum had become 52 times more expensive than silver. Eastman Kodak and most other producers stopped fabrication of the paper in 1916. Russia controlled 90% of the world platinum supply in World War I and all available platinum was used in the war effort. Nevertheless, platinum paper has continued in use until the present, interrupted only by the world wars.

Palladium
In photography, the palladiotype is a less-common variant of the platinotype. The process came into greater use after World War I because the platinum used in the more-common platinotype quickly became too expensive. Due to the rising cost and the consequent shortage of commercial platinum paper, photographers tried to replace the platinum with the much cheaper palladium which gave similar effects. The cost of this metal, however, also started to rise and eventually around 1930 the process was abandoned in favor of more economical alternatives. In recent years, a handful of photographers have taken up the art of mixing platinum and palladium and printing fine art prints with those chemicals, despite its cost.

Characteristics of a palladium print, compared to a platinum print:
A warmer tone
Easier to solarize (see the Sabatier Effect)
Large tonal range, up to D= 2.1, thus requiring a contrast-rich negative for printing
Deeper blacks, with a higher maximum density
A softer image, with delicate highlights

Chemistry
Platinum printing is based on the light sensitivity of ferric oxalate. Ferric oxalate is reduced to ferrous oxalate by UV-light. The ferrous oxalate then reacts with platinum(II) or palladium(II) reducing it to elemental platinum (or palladium), which builds up the image.

By varying the amount of platinum versus palladium and the addition of oxidizing chemicals such as hydrogen peroxide and potassium dichromate or potassium chlorate, the contrast and "color" of the final image can be modified. Because of the non-uniformity of the coating and mixing phases of the process, no two prints are exactly the same.

In 2002, working from research done by Howard Efner and Richard Sullivan, Dick Arentz formulated the methodology for using sodium chloroplatinate as a contrast control agent. Richard Sullivan coined the term Na2 and began to sell a 20% solution through Bostick and Sullivan. Arentz found that, since it is a platinum compound (sodium chloroplatinATE), it does not work with platinum prints (potassium chloroplatinITE). It does, however, shorten the scale of a pure palladium print. When minute quantities of sodium chloroplatinate are added to the palladium salt/ferric oxalate emulsion it produces the high-contrast prints needed for thin negatives, but does not exhibit the granularity found when using traditional chlorates. A palladium print made with potassium chlorate will take on a warm, sepia tone. The same print using sodium chloroplatinate will have cooler tones similar to those of a platinum/palladium print.
 
The inherent low sensitivity of the process occurs because the ferric oxalate is sensitive to ultraviolet light only, thus specialized light sources must be used and exposure times are many times greater than those used in silver-based photographic processes.
 
Due to the unavailability of pre-coated sensitized paper, all platinum/palladium printing is done on paper coated by the printer. The light sensitive chemicals are mixed from powdered basic chemicals, or some commercially available solutions, then hand applied with a brush or a cylindrical "pusher".
 
Many artists achieve varying effects by choosing different papers for different surface characteristics, including vellum, 100% cotton rag, silk, and rice, among others. On the collecting market, platinum prints often sell for many times what a similar silver-gelatin print would bring.

Notable photographers using the technique

 Dick Arentz
 David Bailey
 George Charles Beresford
 Manuel Álvarez Bravo
 Alvin Langdon Coburn
 Lois Conner
 Imogen Cunningham
 Edward S. Curtis
 F. Holland Day
 Dazeley
 Frederick H. Evans
 Laura Gilpin
 Naohisa Hara
 Frederick Hollyer
 Gertrude Kasebier
 David Michael Kennedy
 
 Sal Lopes
 Robert Mapplethorpe
 Andrea Modica
 Tina Modotti
 Isabel Muñoz
 Irving Penn
 Ted Preuss
 Sebastiao Salgado
 Tom Sandberg
 J. Shimon & J. Lindemann
 Edward Steichen
 Alfred Stieglitz
 Paul Strand
 George A. Tice
 Robert Vano
 Edward Weston
 Clarence H. White

 Trevor and Faye Yerbury

See also
 Photographic processes

References

Further reading
 
 
 Dick Arentz. Platinum & Palladium Printing, Second Edition. Focal Press. 2004

External links 

Photographic processes dating from the 19th century
Alternative photographic processes